Nerodia clarkii, commonly known as the salt marsh snake, is a species of semiaquatic, nonvenomous, colubrid snake found in the southeastern United States, in the brackish salt marshes along the Gulf of Mexico from Florida to Texas, with a population in northern Cuba.

Etymology
The specific name, clarkii, is in honor of American surveyor and naturalist John Henry Clark (1830-1885).

Description
Populations of the Gulf salt marsh snake (N. c. clarkii) from the vicinity of Corpus Christi, Texas, to the Gulf Hammock region of Florida are gray, tan or yellow with four brown to black longitudinal stripes.

Populations in Florida from Tampa Bay south to Miami and northward along the Atlantic coast to the vicinity of Cape Canaveral are referred to as the mangrove salt marsh snake (N. c. compressicauda). This subspecies exhibits many colors and patterns and can be gray, green, or tan with darker banding or may even be solid reddish orange or straw yellow.

A third subspecies, the Atlantic salt marsh snake (N. c. taeniata), is restricted to a small stretch of coastline in Volusia and Indian River Counties, Florida.  This race is smaller than the other two and has a color pattern of four dark stripes on the neck which are replaced by a series of dark blotches or bands on the posterior portion of the snake's body.  It is currently listed as a Threatened Species by the US Fish and Wildlife Service.

Taxonomy
Some sources consider the three races of N. clarkii to be subspecies of the southern water snake, Nerodia fasciata. Others consider not only the three races of N. clarkii, but also the species N. fasciata itself, all to be subspecies of N. sipedon.

Subspecies
The following three subspecies of N. clarkii are recognized as being valid, including the nominotypical subspecies.

Nerodia clarkii clarkii (Baird & Girard, 1853) – Gulf salt marsh snake
Nerodia clarkii compressicauda (Kennicott, 1860) – mangrove salt marsh snake
Nerodia clarkii taeniata (Cope, 1895) – Atlantic salt marsh snake

References

External links
Herps of Texas: Nerodia clarkii
Texas Parks & Wildlife: Gulf Salt Marsh Snake

Further reading
Baird SF, Girard CF (1853). Catalogue of North American Reptiles in the Museum of the Smithsonian Institution. Part I.—Serpents. Washington, District of Columbia: Smithsonian Institution. xvi + 172 pp. (Regina clarkii, new species, p. 48).
Boulenger GA (1893). Catalogue of the Snakes in the British Museum (Natural History). Volume I., Containing the Families ... Colubridæ Aglyphæ, part. London: Trustees of the British Museum (Natural History). (Taylor and Francis, printers). xiii + 448 pp. + Plates I-XXVIII. (Tropidonotus clarkii, p. 238).
Conant, Roger; Bridges, William (1939). What Snake Is That?: A Field Guide to the Snakes of the United States East of the Rocky Mountains. (With 108 drawings by Edmond Malnate). New York and London: D. Appleton-Century Company. Frontispiece map + viii + 163 pp. + Plates A-c, 1-32. (Natrix sipedon clarkii, pp. 105–106 + Plate 20, Figure 57).
Cope ED (1895). "On some new North American Snakes". American Naturalist 29: 676-680. (Natrix compressicauda tæniata, new subspecies, pp. 676–677).
Kennicott R (1860). "Descriptions of New Species of North American Serpents in the Museum of the Smithsonian Institution, Washington". Proceedings of the Academy of Natural Sciences of Philadelphia 12: 328-338. (Nerodia compressicauda, new species, pp. 335–336).
Powell R, Conant R, Collins JT (2016). Peterson Field Guide to Reptiles and Amphibians of Eastern and Central North America, Fourth Edition. Boston and New York: Houghton Mifflin Harcourt. xiv + 494 pp., 47 Plates, 207 Figures.  . (Nerodia clarkii, pp. 414–415 + Plate 40).

More external links

clarkii
Reptiles described in 1853
Reptiles of the United States
Taxa named by Spencer Fullerton Baird
Taxa named by Charles Frédéric Girard